The 2015 UC Davis football team represented the University of California, Davis as a member of the Big Sky Conference during the 2015 NCAA Division I FCS football season. Led by third-year head coach Ron Gould, UC Davis compiled an overall record of 2–9 with a mark of 2–6 in conference play, placing 11th in the Big Sky. The Aggies played home games at Aggie Stadium in Davis, California.

Schedule

Game summaries

at Nevada

South Dakota

at Hawaii

at North Dakota

Montana

Northern Arizona

at Northern Colorado

Southern Utah

at Weber State

Cal Poly

at Sacramento State

References

UC Davis
UC Davis Aggies football seasons
UC Davis Aggies football